Boston Post Road Historic District may refer to one of several historic districts along the Boston Post Road:

Boston Post Road Historic District (Darien, Connecticut), listed on the NRHP in Fairfield County, Connecticut
Boston Post Road Historic District (Weston, Massachusetts), listed on the NRHP in Massachusetts
Boston Post Road Historic District (Rye, New York), listed on the NRHP in New York